Paopi 22 - Coptic Calendar - Paopi 24

The twenty-third day of the Coptic month of Paopi, the second month of the Coptic year. On a common year, this day corresponds to October 20, of the Julian Calendar, and November 2, of the Gregorian Calendar. This day falls in the Coptic season of Peret, the season of emergence.

Commemorations

Saints 
 The martyrdom of Saint Dionysius the Bishop of Corinth 
 The departure of Pope Joseph I, the fifty-second Patriarch of the See of Saint Mark

References 

Days of the Coptic calendar